Brazil national handball team is the national handball team of Brazil and is governed by the Confederação Brasileira de Handebol.

Competitions record

Olympic Games

World Championship

Pan American Games

Pan American Championship

South and Central American Championship

Other competitions

2014 Four Nations Tournament – 
2015 International Handball Tournament of Poland – 
2015 Four Nations Tournament – 
2015 Handball Super Cup – 3rd
2016 International Tournament of Spain – 3rd
2016 Qatar International Handball Tournament – 2nd
2016 Four Nations Tournament – 
2017 Yellow Cup – 2nd
2017 Four Nations Tournament – 
2019 Gjensidige Cup – 3rd
2022 4 Nations Cup (Poland) – 4th
2023 Gjensidige Cup – 3rd

Team

Current squad
Squad for the 2023 World Men's Handball Championship.

Head coach: Marcus Oliveira

Player statistics

Most capped players

Top scorers

Notable players
Bruno Souza
Roberto Casuso

Youth Teams

World Juniors Championship
1991 – 15th
1995 – 17th
1997 – 16th
1999 – 13th
2001 – 11th
2003 – 8th
2005 – 16th
2007 – 16th

Pan American Junior Championship
1993 – 
1997 – 
1999 – 
2001 – 
2002 – 
2005 – 
2007 –

References

External links

IHF profile

Handball in Brazil
Men's national handball teams
Handball